Kleszcze may refer to the following places:
Kleszcze, Podlaskie Voivodeship (north-east Poland)
Kleszcze, Koszalin County in West Pomeranian Voivodeship (north-west Poland)
Kleszcze, Stargard County in West Pomeranian Voivodeship (north-west Poland)